St John's Church is in School Lane, Burwardsley, Cheshire, England. It is recorded in the National Heritage List for England as a designated Grade II listed building. It is an active Anglican parish church in the diocese of Chester, the archdeaconry of Chester and the deanery of Malpas. Its benefice is combined with those of Holy Trinity, Bickerton, St Wenefrede, Bickley, and All Saints, Harthill.

History

The church originates from the 17th century. It has a buttress dated 1730, and the church was restored in 1795. In 1871 a further restoration was carried out by the Chester architect John Douglas, which included the addition of a bell turret. Another restoration, with the addition of a chancel which has been attributed to Douglas, was carried out in about 1878.

Architecture

Exterior

St John's is constructed in ashlar buff sandstone with a Welsh slate roof. Its plan consists of a three-bay nave, a one-bay chancel with a side chapel, and a south porch. The bays of the nave are divided by buttresses and they have two or four-light mullioned windows with arch-headed lights. The east window has three round-headed lights, the central one being taller. The west window is simple with Y-tracery. The bell turret is at the west end and has a pyramidal roof.

Interior
The interior has simple 19th-century fittings. The organ dates from about 1840. Its maker is unknown, and it was restored in 1984 by Whiteley.

External features
The churchyard contains the war graves of two soldiers of World War I.

See also

Listed buildings in Burwardsley
List of church restorations, amendments and furniture by John Douglas

References
Citations

Sources

Further reading

17th-century Church of England church buildings
Churches completed in 1878
Church of England church buildings in Cheshire
Burwardsley, Saint Johns Church
Diocese of Chester
John Douglas buildings